Steve Bren (born July 29, 1960) is a former American racing driver from Newport Beach, California.

Early life
Bren is the son of Diane and Donald Bren, billionaire and chairman of the US-based real estate investment company, the Irvine Company. His paternal grandfather was Hollywood movie producer Milton H. Bren.

Career
After a fairly successful stint in US Formula Super Vee in 1985, Bren moved to the new American Racing Series (ARS) in 1986.  While he only participated in four races, he was competitive in all his ARS starts. That year he also completed rookie orientation for the Indianapolis 500 but could not find a ride to make a qualification attempt. He made two one-off starts in the CART Championship Car series in 1988 at Laguna Seca Raceway and 1990 at Long Beach, however he failed to finish either race. Steve's brother Cary also drove in Super Vee and Indy Lights.

Bren later became a property developer and art collector.

Personal life
Bren has been married twice:
In 1988, he married model Thais Baker in a Roman Catholic ceremony. They subsequently divorced in the 1990s.
In July 2010, he married Erica Spangler of Honolulu, Hawaii.  Bren and Erica have a daughter, Bella Rose Bren born in Ketchum, Idaho.

In 2017, Bren was in trouble with the law for stalking Spangler in Idaho and also held in contempt of court for failing to appear at a civil case where he allegedly owed creditors over $5 million as part of his real estate developments. Bren said he could not pay because he was in rehab for drug and alcohol addiction.

References

1960 births
American people of Irish descent
American people of Jewish descent
Champ Car drivers
Indy Lights drivers
SCCA Formula Super Vee drivers
Living people
Sportspeople from Newport Beach, California
Racing drivers from California